Lino Kasten (born 17 January 2001) is a German professional footballer who plays as a goalkeeper.

Club career
On 1 September 2022, Kasten was released by VfL Wolfsburg.

International career
Kasten has represented Germany at youth international level.

Career statistics

Club

Notes

References

2001 births
Living people
Footballers from Berlin
German footballers
Association football goalkeepers
Germany youth international footballers
2. Liga (Austria) players
FC Viktoria 1889 Berlin players
VfL Wolfsburg players
VfL Wolfsburg II players
SKN St. Pölten players
German expatriate footballers
German expatriate sportspeople in Austria
Expatriate footballers in Austria